This is a list of compositions by Fernando Sor.

Works for guitar with opus numbers

Guitar sonatas
 Op. 14, Guitar Sonata No. 1 in D major (in one movement: Andante — Allegro) – wr. c. 1798; publ. 1810 in Paris as “Grand solo pour guitare”
 Op. 15b, Guitar Sonata No. 2 in C major (in one movement: Allegro moderato) – wr. c. 1800; publ. 1810 in Paris as “Sonate”
 Op. 22, Guitar Sonata No. 3 in C major (four movements: Allegro — Adagio — Menuetto — Rondo) – publ. June 1807 in Madrid; publ. again 1825 in Paris as “Grande sonate”
 Op. 25, Guitar Sonata No. 4 in C major (four movements: Andante largo — Allegro non troppo — Andantino grazioso — Menuetto) – wr. 1826 in Moscow; publ. 1827 in Paris as “Deuxième grande sonate”

Fantasies
 Op. 4, Fantasy No. 1 in A major – publ. 1814
 Op. 7, Fantasy No. 2, or Largo non tanto in C minor followed by Theme and Variations in C major – publ. 1814, ded. Ignaz Pleyel
 Op. 10, Fantasy No. 3 in F major – 1816
 Op. 12, Fantasy No. 4 in C major – 1821
 Op. 16, Fantasy No. 5, or Introduction, Theme and Variations on Nel cor più non mi sento by Paisiello – 1819
 Op. 21, Fantasy No. 6, Les adieux – 1825
 Op. 30, Fantasy No. 7, or Variations brillantes sur deux airs favoris connus (uses sonata form) – 1828
 Op. 40, Fantaisie sur un air favori écossais (Ye Banks and Braes) – 1829, ded. Mary Jane Burdett
 Op. 46, Souvenirs d'amitié (Fantasy) in A major – 1831, ded. Jules Regondi
 Op. 52, Fantaisie villageoise – 1832, ded. Dioniso Aguado
 Op. 58, Fantaisie facile in A minor – 1835, ded. Mme. Boischevalier
 Op. 59, Fantaisie élégiaque in E major – 1835, on the death of Charlotte Beslay

Variations, excl. fantasies
 Op. 3, Varied Theme and Minuet – 1816
 Op. 9, Introduction and Variations on a Theme by Mozart – 1821, ded. Carlos Sor
 Op. 11, Two Varied Themes and Twelve Minuets – 1821
 Op. 15a, Les folies d'Espagne and a Minuet – 1810, rev. 1822
 Op. 15c, Varied Theme in C major – 1810, rev. 1822
 Op. 20, Introduction and Varied Theme – 1824
 Op. 26, Introduction and Variations on Que ne suis-je la fougère! – 1827
 Op. 27, Introduction and Variations on Gentil houssard – 1827
 Op. 28, Introduction and Variations on Malbroug (Marlborough) s’en va-t-en guerre – 1827

Didactic music
 Op. 6, Twelve Studies (First Book) – 1815
 Op. 23, Cinquième divertissement très facile in D major – 1825
 Op. 29, Twelve Studies (Second Book) – 1827
 Op. 31, Leçons progressives (24 Progressive Lessons) – 1828
 Op. 35, Exercices très faciles (24 Very Easy Exercises) – 1828
 Op. 44a, 24 Progressive Studies – 1831
 Op. 44b, Six Easy Waltzes, for two guitars – 1831, ded. Mlle. Lira
 Op. 45, Voyons si c'est ça: 6 Easy Pieces – 1831
 Op. 48, Est-ce bien ça?: 6 Easy Pieces – 1832
 Op. 55, Three Easy Duets – 1833
 Op. 60, 25 Progressive Studies – 1837
 Op. 61, Three Easy Duets – 1837

Guitar duos, excl. didactic music
 Op. 34, L’encouragement (Fantasy), duet in E major – 1828
 Op. 38, Divertissement, duet in G major – 1829, ded. Mrs. Dühring
 Op. 39, Six Waltzes, for two guitars – 1830, ded. Mlle. Natalie Houzé
 Op. 41, The Two Friends, for two guitars – 1830, ded. Dioniso Aguado
 Op. 49, Divertissement militaire, for two guitars – 1832, ded. Mlle. S. Talbot
 Op. 53, The First Step, duet – 1833
 Op. 54b, Fantasy, duet – 1833, ded. Mlle. Natalie Houzé
 Op. 62, Divertissement, duet in E major – 1837, ded. N. Coste
 Op. 63, Remembrances of Russia, duet in E minor – 1837, ded. N. Coste

Divertimentos, waltzes, short pieces and other pieces
 Op. 1, Six divertissements pour la guitare – 1813
 Op. 2, Six divertissements pour la guitare – 1813
 Op. 5, Six petites pièces très faciles – 1814
 Op. 8, Six divertissements – 1818, ded. Miss Smith
 Op. 13, Six divertissements – 1819
 Op. 17, Six Waltzes – 1823, ded. Mr. Pastou
 Op. 18, Six Waltzes – 1823
 Op. 19, Six Airs from The Magic Flute – 1824
 Op. 24, Huit petites pièces – 1826
 Op. 32, Six petites pièces – 1828, ded. Mlle. Wainewright
 Op. 33, Trois pièces de société (First Set) – 1828, ded. Mlle. Athénaïs Paulian
 Op. 36, Trois pièces de société (Second Set) - 1828, ded. Mr. Pastou
 Op. 37, Serenade in E major – 1829, ded. Mlle. S. Talbot
 Op. 42, Six Short Pieces – 1830, ded. Mlle. Natalie Houzé
 Op. 43, Mes ennuis: Six Bagatelles – 1831
 Op. 47, Six Short Pieces – 1832, ded. Mlle. Crabouillet
 Op. 50, Capriccio in E major, Le Calme – 1832, ded. Mlle. Crabouillet
 Op. 51, A la bonne heure: Six Waltzes – 1832
 Op. 54a, Concert Piece – 1832, ded. Son Altesse Royale la Princesse Adélaïde
 Op. 56, Souvenirs d'une soirée à Berlin – date unknown
 Op. 57, Six Waltzes and a Gallop – 1834, ded. Mlle. Larivée

Works without opus numbers

Orchestral music

Symphonies
 Symphony No. 1 in C
 Symphony No. 2 in E-flat
 Symphony No. 3 in F

Incidental music
 La Elvira portuguesa (Madrid, 1804)

Ballets
 La foire de Smyrne (1821, Paris — the music is lost)
 Le seigneur généreux (1821, London — the music is lost)
 Cendrillon (1822, London; 1823, Paris)
 Alphonse et Léonore, ou L'amant peintre (1823, London in one act; enlarged to three acts for Moscow the next year; revised in 1827 as Le sicilien, ou L'amour peintre for Paris)
 Hercule et Omphale (1826, St Petersburg)
 Hassan et le calife, ou Le dormeur éveillé (1828, London — the music is lost)
 The Fair Sicilian, or Conquered Coquette, or La belle Arsène (1834, London — the music is lost)
 Arsène, ou La baguette magique (1839, Brussels)

Concerto (spurious)
 Violin Concerto in G major — falsely attributed; actually written by Chevalier de Saint-Georges and published in 1773 as the latter's Op.2, No.1

Chamber music
 3 string quartets
 String trios with guitar
 La romanesca for flute (or violin) and guitar
 March for Military Band — the music is lost
 March for the Funeral of Czar Alexander I — the music exists both in manuscript and printed version for piano
Piano 4-hands
 3 Waltzes (First Set) — the music is lost
 3 Waltzes (Second Set, 1818) ded. Mlle. F. Rehausen
 3 Waltzes (Third Set, 1819) ded. Ladies Jane & Georgina Paget
 3 Waltzes (Fourth Set, 1820) ded. Ladies Augusta & Agnes Paget
 3 Waltzes (Fifth Set, 1820) ded. Mlle. B. Bollman
 3 Waltzes (Sixth Set, 1821) ded. Miss A. McDougall
 3 Waltzes (Seventh Set, 1821) ded. Mrs. Ellis Heaton
 3 Waltzes (Eighth Set, 1822) ded. Miss Adolphus
 3 Waltzes (Ninth Set, advertised but never published in England, 1826 in Paris)
 3 Waltzes (Tenth Set, 1823) ded. Miss Waldengraves
 3 Waltzes arranged after music by Sor, Mozart and Mohor (First Set, 1820)
 3 Waltzes arranged after music by Mohor, Mozart and Steibelt (Second Set, 1822)
 Sonata in G Minor on Swedish National Airs (1815) ded. Baroness de Rehausen
 Arrangement of the Funeral March for Harp Guitar
 Arrangement of the Military March for Guitar

Instrumental music
for Guitar
 fifty-eight Minuets
 Air varié in C major
 Boléro for 2 guitars
 Fantasia in D major
 La candeur: Petite rêverie (Ingenuity: Little Dream)
 March from the ballet Cendrillon
 Thème varié
 Romance d'amour
for Harpolyre
 3 pieces (pub. 1830)
 6 Petites pièces progressives (pub. 1830)
 Marche funèbre
for Piano
 22 Waltzes (First Set, 1819)
 6 Waltzes (Second Set, 1820)
 Les Cuirassiers (6 pieces, 1821)
 Les Favorites des Salons (6 pieces, 1821)
 Les Choisies (6 pieces, 1822)
 Mazurka
 Arrangement of the Funeral March for Harp Guitar
Trois Valses et un Galop (dedicated to Mademoiselle Thomas)

Vocal music
Sacred scores
 Ave maris stella in D minor
 Exultet coelum laudibus in C major
 O Crux, ave in D minor
 O Salutaris hostia in E flat major
Secular cantatas
 Cantata a S.E. la Signora Duchessa d'Albufera
 Draps i ferro vell
 Himno para el cumpleaños de S.M. La Reina Gobernadora de España
Songs and arias
 Seguidillas For voice and guitar or piano – 1800–8
 1. Cesa de atormentarme (Stop tormenting me)
 2. De amor en las prisiones (Of love in the prisons)
 3. Acuérdate bien, mío (Remember well, mine)
 4. Prepárame la tumba (Prepare mi tomb)
 5. Cómo ha de resolverse? (How should it be resolved?)
 6. Muchacha ... y la verguenza? (Young woman ... and the shame?)
 7. Si dices que mis ojos (If you say that my eyes)
 8. Los Canónigos, madre (The canons, mother)
 9. El que quisiera amando (He who wants to while loving)
 10. Si a otro cuando me quieres (If to another while you love me)
 11. Las Mujeres y cuerdas (The women and strings)
 12. Mis descuidados ojos (My careless eyes)
 13 seguidillas or boleros for voice and guitar or piano
 33 arias

Operas
 Telemaco nell'isola di Calipso (25 August 1797, Barcelona, Teatre de la Santa Creu)
 Don Trastullo [lost]

Didactic works
 Méthode pour la guitare
 École de la mesure (includes 22 pieces for piano 4-hands)

References

 
Sor